Dori Airport  is a public use airport located 2 nm west of Dori, Séno, Burkina Faso.

See also 
List of airports in Burkina Faso

References 

Airports in Burkina Faso
Séno Province